German submarine U-84 was a Type VIIB U-boat of Nazi Germany's Kriegsmarine during World War II.

She was launched on 26 February 1941 and commissioned on 29 April 1941. She operated during the Battle of the Atlantic during the Second World War.

Design
German Type VIIB submarines were preceded by the shorter Type VIIA submarines. U-84 had a displacement of  when at the surface and  while submerged. She had two shafts and two  propellers.

U-84 was fitted with five  torpedo tubes (four fitted at the bow and one at the stern), fourteen torpedoes, one  SK C/35 naval gun, 220 rounds, and one  anti-aircraft gun The boat had a complement of between forty-four and sixty.

Service history
U-84 carried out eight patrols and accounted for six ships sunk and one ship damaged during World War II. She operated in the Gulf of Mexico for a time. Commanded by Captain Uphoff, U-84 torpedoed the freighter Baja California just forward of midships whilst in the Gulf of Mexico on 19 July 1942 at 06:45. Baja California, en route from New Orleans, Louisiana to Key West, was carrying a load of general cargo which included glassware.

Fate

U-84 was sunk while under the command of Horst Uphoff on 7 August 1943 in the North Atlantic, in position  by a Mk 24 homing torpedo dropped on it by a US B24 Liberator aircraft (VB-105/B-4 USN). 46 dead (all hands lost).

Wolfpacks

U-84 took part in seventeen wolfpacks, namely:
 Grönland (16 – 27 August 1941) 
 Markgraf (27 August – 13 September 1941) 
 Schlagetot (20 October – 1 November 1941) 
 Raubritter (1 – 4 November 1941) 
 Seydlitz (27 December 1941 – 13 January 1942) 
 Zieten (13 – 22 January 1942) 
 Endrass (12 – 17 June 1942) 
 Panther (6 – 20 October 1942) 
 Veilchen (20 October – 5 November 1942) 
 Kreuzotter (9 – 19 November 1942) 
 Sturmbock (21 – 26 February 1943) 
 Wildfang (26 February – 5 March 1943) 
 Raubgraf (7 – 20 March 1943) 
 Seewolf (24 – 30 March 1943) 
 Adler (7 – 13 April 1943) 
 Meise (13 – 20 April 1943) 
 Specht (21 – 25 April 1943)

Summary of raiding history

References

Bibliography

External links

German Type VIIB submarines
U-boats commissioned in 1941
U-boats sunk in 1943
U-boats sunk by US aircraft
World War II submarines of Germany
1941 ships
Ships built in Lübeck
Ships lost with all hands
Maritime incidents in August 1943